is a Japanese mystery writer. He is a member of the Honkaku Mystery Writers Club of Japan and one of the representative writers of the new traditionalist movement in Japanese mystery writing.

Works in English translation
Novel
 Murder in the Red Chamber (original title: Kōrōmu no Satsujin), trans. Tyran C. Grillo (Kurodahan Press, 2012)

Short story
 "The Horror in the Kabuki Theatre" (original title: "Gohei Gekijō: Kabuki no Kuni Cthulhu Taiji"), trans. Sheryl Hogg (Lairs of the Hidden Gods 2: Inverted Kingdom, Kurodahan Press, 2005)

Awards and nominations
 1990 – Ayukawa Tetsuya Award for New Mystery Writers: Satsujin Kigeki no Jūsan-nin (Thirteen in a Murder Comedy)
 2002 – Nominee for Honkaku Mystery Award for Best Fiction: Guran Ginyōru Jō (The Castle of Grand Guignol)
 2005 – Nominee for Honkaku Mystery Award for Best Fiction: Murder in the Red Chamber
 2009 – Nominee for Honkaku Mystery Award for Best Fiction: Saiban'in Hōtei (The Lay Judge Court)
 2011 – Nominee for Honkaku Mystery Award for Best Fiction: Kisōkyū Satsujin Jiken
 2013 – Nominee for Honkaku Mystery Award for Best Fiction: Suchīmu Opera (Steam Opera)

Bibliography

Detective Shunsaku Morie series
Novels
 , 1990
 , 1995
 , 1996
 , 1997
 , 1998
 , 1999
 , 2000
 , 2000
 , 2001
 , 2001
 , 2006
 , 2008
 , 2010
 , 2011
 , 2012
 , 2013
Short story collections
 , 1998
 , 2001
 , 2005
 , 2006
 , 2008

Modern City series
 , 1994 – Novel
 , 2009 – Short story collection

Jichikei tokuso series
 , 1998 – Short story collection
 , 2002 – Novel

Standalone mystery novels
 , 2004
 , 1994
 , 2004 (Murder in the Red Chamber, Kurodahan Press, 2012)
 , 2012

Short story collections
 , 2002
 , 2003
 , 2007
 
 
 
  (The Horror in the Kabuki Theatre)
 , 2000
 , 2002
 , 2006
 , 2007
 , 2011
 , 2013
 , 2013

Juvenile mystery novels
 Neo Detective Boys series
 , 2004
 , 2005
 , 2005
 , 2008
 , 2012
 , 2015

Historical fiction
 
 Vol.1, 1995
 Vol.2, 1996
 Vol.3, 1997

See also

Golden Age of Detective Fiction#The "new traditionalist" movement in Japanese mystery writing
Honkaku Mystery Writers Club of Japan
Japanese detective fiction

References

External links
 Twitter
 Murder in the Red Chamber by Taku Ashibe, Kurodahan Press
 Review of Murder in the Red Chamber by David Cozy in The Japan Times

1958 births
20th-century Japanese novelists
21st-century Japanese novelists
Japanese male short story writers
Japanese mystery writers
Japanese crime fiction writers
Japanese horror writers
Living people
Writers from Osaka
20th-century Japanese short story writers
21st-century Japanese short story writers
Male novelists
20th-century Japanese male writers
21st-century male writers